Kick-Ass 2: Original Motion Picture Soundtrack is a compilation album of various artists' music from the 2013 film Kick-Ass 2. Though the song "I Hate Myself for Loving You" by Joan Jett and the Blackhearts is featured in the film, it does not appear on the soundtrack.

Track listing

Reception 
Heather Phares of Allmusic gave the album a mixed review, comparing it negatively to the original film's soundtrack and noting the soundtrack's lack of flow. She positively noted that it "echoes Kick-Ass mix of tender and violent music" and called it "a collection with so much energy that its more scattered moments barely matter."

The Score 

Kick-Ass 2: Original Motion Picture Score is a soundtrack that features the musical score by film composers Henry Jackman and Matthew Margeson for the 2013 film Kick-Ass 2.

Track listing

References

Kick-Ass (franchise)
Superhero film soundtracks
Comedy film soundtracks